This is a list of Danish radio stations broadcasting in the Danish language.

National

DR 

 DR P1
 DR P2
 DR P3
 DR P4
 DR P5
 DR P6 Beat
 DR P8 Jazz

Bauer Media Group 

 The Voice
 Radio 100
 NOVA FM
 Radio Soft
 POP FM
 MyRock
 Radio Klassisk

Others 

 MTV Radio
 Radio4
 Rise FM Denmark

Local and regional

Mediehuset Midtjyllands Avis 

 Radio Silkeborg
 Radio Alfa Silkeborg
 Radio Solo

Sjællandske Medier 

 Radio SLR
 Radio Køge

Jysk Fynske Medier 

 Skala FM
 Radio VLR
 Classic FM
 Radio Viborg
 Pulz FM

Others 

 Din Radio
 Globus Guld
 Hvidovre NærRadio
 Radio ABC
 Radio Als
 Radio Diablo
 Radio Globus
 Radio Go FM
 Radio Hinnerup
 Radio Køge
 Radio Limfjord
 Radio Max Danmark
 Radio Nord
 Radio Nordjyske
 Radio Skive
 Radio SydhavsØerne
 Radio Viborg
 Radio Victoria
 Radio WMR
 Radio OZ-Viola
 Øst FM

References

External links

Radio stations in Denmark
Danish
Denmark